The Zuni (Zuñi) River is a tributary of the Little Colorado River in the southwestern United States. It has its origin in Cibola County, New Mexico, in the Zuñi Mountains at the Continental Divide. The river flows off the western slopes of the Zuñi Mountains in a generally southwesterly direction through the Zuni Indian Reservation to join the Little Colorado River in eastern Arizona.

Course
The Zuñi River begins about 4.5 miles east-northeast of Black Rock at the confluence of the Rio Pescado and Rio Nutria. It was dammed at Black Rock in 1908 forming the Black Rock Reservoir. The river has a small dam at the Zuni Pueblo. The river is intermittent, drying up during drought periods, and often during most of the winter, except where there are perennial springs that give it surface flow for a short distance.

Fossils

The Zuni Basin is home to the Moreno Hill Formation where fossils from the later Cretaceous 92 Mya. Fossils include dinosaurs like Zuniceratops and Suskityrannus (Zuni Coelurosaur).

Environment
The Zuni River is one of the last remaining habitats of the Zuni bluehead sucker.

Religious aspect
The Zuni River is sacred to the Zuni people.  Every four years, a religious pilgrimage is made on the "Barefoot Trail" to Kołuwala:wa, also called "Zuni Heaven", at the confluence of the Zuni River and the Little Colorado.

See also
 List of rivers of Arizona
 List of rivers of New Mexico

References

External links
 Official web site of the Zuni Tribe
 Zuni River Watershed Act of 1991
 

Religious places of the indigenous peoples of North America
Arizona placenames of Native American origin
Rivers of Arizona
Rivers of New Mexico
Rivers of Apache County, Arizona
Rivers of Cibola County, New Mexico